Ectoedemia contorta is a moth of the family Nepticulidae. It is found from the Czech Republic and Slovakia to Spain, Italy and Greece.

The wingspan is 4.6-5.6 mm. Adults are on wing in autumn. There is one generation per year.

The larvae feed on Quercus pubescens. They mine the leaves of their host plant. The mine resembles that of Ectoedemia albifasciella.

External links
Fauna Europaea
bladmineerders.nl
A Taxonomic Revision Of The Western Palaearctic Species Of The Subgenera Zimmermannia Hering And Ectoedemia Busck s.str. (Lepidoptera, Nepticulidae), With Notes On Their Phylogeny

Nepticulidae
Moths of Europe
Moths described in 1985